Lake Ilopango is a crater lake which fills an 8 by 11 km (72 km2 or 28 sq mi) volcanic caldera in central El Salvador, on the borders of the San Salvador, La Paz, and Cuscatlán departments. Any surplus drains via the Jiboa River to the Pacific Ocean. An eruption of the Ilopango volcano is considered a possible source for the extreme weather events of 535–536. The local military airbase, Ilopango International Airport, has annual airshows where international pilots from all over the world fly over San Salvador City and Ilopango lake.

Eruptive history

Four major dacitic–rhyolitic eruptions occurred during the late Pleistocene and Holocene, producing pyroclastic flows and tephra that blanketed much of the country.

The caldera collapsed most recently sometime between 410 and 535 AD (based on radiocarbon dating of plant life directly related to the eruption), which produced widespread pyroclastic flows and devastated Mayan cities; however, a team of scientists concluded that the volcanic eruption might have happened in 431 AD ±2, based on volcanic shards taken from ice cores in Greenland, levels of sulphur recorded in ice cores from Antarctica, and radiocarbon dating of a charred tree found in volcanic ash deposits. The "ash-cloud fallout ... blanketed an area of at least 10,000 square kilometers waist-deep in pumice and ash", which would have stopped all agricultural endeavor in the area for decades. It is also theorized that the eruption and subsequent weather events and agricultural failures directly led to the abandonment of Teotihuacan by the original inhabitants.

It was hypothesized that this eruption caused the extreme weather events of 535–536 in Europe and Asia, but this is unlikely given the research published in 2020 that dates the eruption to 431 AD. 

Later eruptions formed several lava domes within the lake and near its shore. The only historical eruption, which occurred from December 31, 1879, up to March 26, 1880, produced a lava dome and had a VEI of 3. The lava dome reached the surface of the lake, forming the islets known as Islas Quemadas.

Events

On July 5, 2004 the ilusionist, Francis Fanci was tagged and submerged inside a trunk from which he emerged after thirty seconds. On the other hand, in 2004 Matthew Hatfield Knight, eldest son of the owner of the international consortium of Nike sports shoes, died of a heart attack while diving with his colleagues.

See also
 List of volcanoes in El Salvador
 Extreme weather events of 535-536
 Year Without a Summer
 Tierra Blanca Joven eruption

References

External links

 Global Volcanism Program: Ilopango
 Lake Ilopango at NASA Earth Observatory website

Lakes of El Salvador
Volcanoes of El Salvador
Calderas of Central America
Volcanic crater lakes
VEI-6 volcanoes
1879 natural disasters
1880 natural disasters
1879 in El Salvador
1880 in El Salvador
New islands